Christopher Julian Leslie (born 15 December 1956) is a British folk rock musician. He joined Fairport Convention in 1997.

Early years

Leslie grew up in Banbury, Oxfordshire. His brother John steered him toward The Watersons' Frost and Fire, Dave Swarbrick, and The Corries. In 1969 he began to teach himself fiddle and modelled himself on the fiddle-playing of Dave Swarbrick of Fairport Convention, Peter Knight of Steeleye Span, and Barry Dransfield.

Leslie made his first recording at the age of 16, with a Banbury-based folk rock band and then went on to forge a successful career around the folk clubs with his brother John - cutting their first album, The Ship of Time in 1976. During this period he was also the fiddle player for The Hookey Band and a member of the morris dancers at Adderbury. It was around this time that he first came to the attention of Fairport's Dave Pegg.

From 1981-1983 Chris Leslie studied violin making, under the watchful eye of maker Patrick Jowett, at the Newark School of Violin Making in Nottinghamshire, England. He currently plays the second fiddle he made at Newark on stage.

Session work 

Since then he has worked with Whippersnapper, the Albion Band, All About Eve, Simon Mayor and Ian Anderson (of Jethro Tull). In 1981 he contributed to a cassette tape produced by CND. It was called Demo Tape and had limited distribution. Also on the tape were songs by Fairport Convention. In 1983 he contributed to More Demo Tapes, again a cassette for CND. He accompanied Steve Ashley on the song "Down By the Embankment" on the album All Through the Year (1991). This was a compilation of original tracks. He appeared on People on the Highway (Bert Jansch tribute album, 2000). There were other appearances on Steve Ashley albums (see discography).  In 2003, Chris played violin on several tracks from Mostly Autumn's album Passengers. In late 2007 he recorded violin and mandolin parts on Dan Crisp's debut album Far From Here.

With Fairport and solo albums 
In 1997 he joined Fairport Convention as singer, songwriter and multi-instrumentalist. He has recorded five solo albums - The Flow, The Gift, Dancing Days, Origins, Turquoise Tales and Fiddle Back. At first sight Dancing Days appears to be a Fairport Convention album, as it features Simon Nicol, Dave Pegg, Ashley Hutchings and Ric Sanders. However, each of these artists appears only in a sequence of duos with Leslie. He has also recorded collaborations with Ashley Hutchings including  Grandson of Morris On .

Chris also takes part in an annual Christmas tour with St Agnes Fountain and also takes part in "A Feast of Fiddles" - a collaboration with Peter Knight, Tom Leary (The Hookey Band), Ian Cutler, Phil Beer (Show of Hands) and Brian McNeill (The Battlefield Band).

Personal life 
He is Buddhist, a vegetarian, and a teetotaler.

Discography

Solo
 1994 - The Gift
 1997 - The Flow 
 2004 - Dancing Days 
 2013 - Origins
 2015 - Turquoise Tales
 2020 - Fiddle Back

In groups
 1985 - Whippersnapper: Promises 
 1987 - Whippersnapper: Tsubo 
 1988 - Whippersnapper: These Foolish Strings 
 1990 - Whippersnapper: Fortune 
 1991 - Whippersnapper: Stories 
 1996 - The Albion Band: Demi Paradise 
 1997 - Fairport Convention: Who Knows Where the Time Goes? 
 1999 - Fairport Convention: The Wood and the Wire 
 2001 - St Agnes Fountain: Acoustic Carols for Christmas 
 2001 - Fairport Convention: XXXV 
 2002 - Morris On Band: Grandson of Morris On 
 2002 - St Agnes Fountain: Comfort and Joy 
 2004 - Feast of Fiddles: Nicely Wrong 
 2004 - Fairport Convention: Over the Next Hill 
 2006 - St Agnes Fountain: The White Xmas Album 
 2007 - Fairport Convention: Sense of Occasion 
 2008 - St Agnes Fountain: Soal Cake 
 2010 - Feast of Fiddles: Walk Before You Fly 
 2010 - St Agnes Fountain: Spirit of Christmas 
 2011 - Fairport Convention: Festival Bell
 2012 - Fairport Convention: By Popular Request 
 2012 - St Agnes Fountain: Twelve Years of Christmas
 2013 - Feast of Fiddles: Rise Above It 
 2014 - St Agnes Fountain: Christmas is Not Far Away 
 2015 - Fairport Convention: Myths and Heroes
 2017 - Fairport Convention: 50:50@50
 2017 - Feast of Fiddles: Sleight of Elbow
 2017 - St Agnes Fountain: 25/12
 2020 - Fairport Convention: Shuffle and Go
 2021 - St Agnes Fountain: Night of a Million Stars

Appearances with Steve Ashley
1999 - The Test of Time 
2001 - Everyday Lives 
2006 - Live in Concert

References

External links
The Hookey Band
, including two written and performed by Chris Leslie
Website of Fairport Convention
Chris Leslie on CND tapes

1956 births
Living people
People from Banbury
English folk musicians
English fiddlers
British male violinists
Fairport Convention members
British folk rock musicians
21st-century violinists
21st-century British male musicians
The Albion Band members
Whippersnapper (band) members